Sad Girl is the second solo album by alternative country musician Amy Allison. It was released on September 25, 2001 on Diesel Only Records in the United States, following its earlier release on Glitterhouse Records in Europe. It features contributions from Greg Leisz, Mike Daly (Whiskeytown), Will Rigby (dB's, Steve Earle), and Neal Casal.

Reception

No Depression wrote that the album's 12 songs "exhibit a directness of expression, a simple universality clearly achieved with considerable composing and life experience." A more mixed review in the New York Post criticized Allison's voice on the album as "a stuffed nasal style that makes every song sound like she should see a doctor."

Track listing
Listless and Lonesome
One Thing in Mind
Sad Girl
Everybody Thinks You're an Angel
It's Not Wrong
Family
Shadow of a Man
Sad State of Affairs
Where Did You Go?
Lost on You
Do I Miss You?
New Year's Eve

References

2001 albums
Amy Allison albums
Diesel Only Records albums